S2F2 may refer to:

 S2F2, the chemical formula for:
 Disulfur difluoride
 Thiothionyl fluoride